777 Main Street is a skyscraper located in Fort Worth, Texas. At , it is the third tallest building in Fort Worth. It has 40 stories, and was completed in 1983. Its address is 777 Main Street, and it takes up the block bounded by Commerce Street, East 7th Street, Main Street, and Northeast 6th Street. The building stands at the site where the demolished Aviation Building existed between 1930 and 1978.

The building was significantly damaged by an F3 tornado on March 28, 2000, about 1,300 of the 5,000 buildings windows were blown out and repairs were done in 2001.

The building has been known under a series of names in the past as its main tenants have changed. Before 1998 it was known as the Continental Plaza; from 1998 to 2000 as the UPR Plaza; and from 2000 to 2012 as the Carter Burgess Plaza.

References

External links
Official building website
Carter and Burgess Plaza at Emporis.com

Buildings and structures completed in 1983
Skyscraper office buildings in Fort Worth, Texas